Jinja is a web template engine for the Python programming language. It was created by Armin Ronacher and is licensed under a BSD License. Jinja is similar to the Django template engine but provides Python-like expressions while ensuring that the templates are evaluated in a sandbox. It is a text-based template language and thus can be used to generate any markup as well as source code.

The Jinja template engine allows customization of tags, filters, tests, and globals.  Also, unlike the Django template engine, Jinja allows the template designer to call functions with arguments on objects.
Jinja is Flask's default template engine  and it is also used by Ansible, Trac, and Salt.

Features
Some of the features of Jinja are:
 sandboxed execution
 automatic HTML escaping to prevent cross-site scripting (XSS) attacks
 template inheritance
 compiles down to the optimal Python code just-in-time
 optional ahead-of-time template compilation
 easy to debug (for example, line numbers of exceptions directly point to the correct line in the template)
 configurable syntax

Jinja, like Smarty, also ships with an easy-to-use filter system similar to the Unix pipeline.

Example 
Here is a small example of a template file example.html.jinja:
<!DOCTYPE html>
<html>
  <head>
    <title>{{ variable|escape }}</title>
  </head>
  <body>
  {%- for item in item_list %}
    {{ item }}{% if not loop.last %},{% endif %}
  {%- endfor %}
  </body>
</html>
and templating code:
from jinja2 import Template
with open('example.html.jinja') as f:
    tmpl = Template(f.read())
print(tmpl.render(
    variable = 'Value with <unsafe> data',
    item_list = [1, 2, 3, 4, 5, 6]
))
This produces the HTML string:
<!DOCTYPE html>
<html>
  <head>
    <title>Value with <unsafe> data</title>
  </head>
  <body>
    1,
    2,
    3,
    4,
    5,
    6
  </body>
</html>

Sources

External links 
 

Free software programmed in Python
Free system software
Python (programming language) libraries
Python (programming language) software
Template engines
Software using the BSD license
Articles with example Python (programming language) code